Finally / We Got a Love Thang: Remix Collection is the first limited remix collection by CeCe Peniston, issued exclusively in Japan in 1992. The album was compiled of the singer's first two singles, as a result of charting both in the Japanese Top 10 at the same time (while song "Finally" peaked at number two, "We Got a Love Thang" topped at number three eventually). The album included overall eight versions remixed by David Morales, Steve Hurley, Maurice Joshua and E-Smoove.

The second and enhanced remix set, simply entitled Remix Collection, mapped the Peniston's singles' career since her third release, "Keep On Walkin'", to "Hit by Love" single. The album featured nine alternate versions previously available only on vinyl and was issued on CD in Japan in 1994.

Track listing

Credits and personnel
 CeCe Peniston – lead vocal, writer
 Felipe Delgado - producer, co-writer
 R.K. Jackson - co-producer
 E.L. Linnear - co-writer
 David Morales - remix, additional producer, percussion

 Steve "Silk" Hurley - remix, arranger, keyboards, drum programming, producer
 E-Smoove - remix, additional producer
 Maurice Joshua - remix, edits, additional producer
 David Sussman – engineer
 Eric Kupper – acoustic piano and solo
 Philip Kelsey – engineer, additional producer
 Kym Sims - back vocal
 Chantay Savage - writer, back vocal
 Darnnel Rush - back vocal

 Larry Sturm - engineer
 Eric Miller - writer, engineer
 Jere "Jam" McAllister - writer, keyboards
 Manny Lehman – executive producer
 Mark Mazzetti – executive producer
 Aztec Studios, Phoenix, Arizona - recording studio
 Tangle Wood Studios, Brookfield, Illinois - recording studio
 Wax Museum Music/Mainlot Music (BMI) - publisher
 Last Song, Inc. - publisher
 Third Coast Music (ASCAP) - admin

References

General

Specific

External links
 

CeCe Peniston remix albums
1992 remix albums
A&M Records albums
A&M Records remix albums